Congdon's Shop is a hamlet in the parish of North Hill,  Cornwall, England. It is at the junction of the B3254 Launceston to Liskeard road and the B3257 road from Plusha to Callington.

Notable people
Judith Jolly, Baroness Jolly (Baroness Jolly of Congdon's Shop)

References

Hamlets in Cornwall